Tabernaemontana corymbosa is a species of plant in the family Apocynaceae. It is found in Brunei, China, Indonesia, Laos, Malaysia, Myanmar, Singapore, Thailand, and Vietnam. Glossy green leaves and faintly sweet scented flower. Flowers continuously all year. Frost tolerant. Grows to about 2metres. Likes full sun to part shade. A number of cultivars are available.

Chemical composition
Multiple compounds of different classes such as Iboga alkaloids and Bisindole alkaloids have been isolated from this plant. Alkaloids such as conodusine A-E, conolodinines A-D, conophylline, conophyllinine and taberyunines A-I are present in which many shows antiproliferative and cytotoxic actions.

References

corymbosa
Least concern plants
Flora of Asia
Plants described in 1829
Taxonomy articles created by Polbot